Mechanized Infantry Forces are the general basis and primary combat formations of the Ukrainian Ground Forces. They execute tasks of holding the occupied areas, lines and positions tasks of enemy's impacts repelling, of penetrating the enemy's defense lines, defeating the enemy forces, capturing the important areas, lines and objectives, and can operate in structure of marine and landing troops.

The Mechanized Infantry Corps of the UGF are organized into mechanized infantry brigades and motorized infantry brigades that help perform the principal missions entrusted to the UGF and the wider Armed Forces as a whole.

Brigades List

Vehicular equipment 
The Mechanized Infantry are equipped with the following vehicles:

 M55S, T-62, T-64, T-72, T-80, Leopard 1, Leopard 2, M1 Abrams, Challenger 2, PT-91 Twardy main battle tanks in armored battalions
 AMX-10 RC wheeled light tanks/armored reconnaissance vehicles in armored battalions and reconnaissance battalions
 BMP-1, BMP-2, BMP-3, BVP M-80, M2 Bradley, AIFV, Marder 1 IFV, AMX-10P, Combat Vehicle 90 tracked infantry fighting vehicles in tracked mechanized infantry battalions
 BTR-3, BTR-4 wheeled infantry fighting vehicles in wheeled mechanized infantry battalions or wheeled motorized infantry battalions
 BTR-60, BTR-70, BTR-80, BTR Otaman 6x6, Kamaz Typhoon, Ural Typhoon, VAB, M1117, ACSV, TAB-71, Stryker, ACMAT Bastion, Patria Pasi wheeled armored personnel carriers in wheeled mechanized infantry or wheeled motorized infantry battalions
 MT-LB, GT-MU, FV103 Spartan, FV432, FV430 Bulldog, M113 tracked armored personnel carriers in tracked mechanized infantry battalions
 BRDM-2, Ferret, Fennek wheeled armored scout cars, some on tank destroyer configuration
 MT-LB-12 (TD) tracked tank destroyers
 FV107 Scimitar tracked armored reconnissance vehicles
 Bushmaster, AMZ Dzik, Cougar, Mastiff, Mamba APC, International MaxxPro, BMC Kirpi, BPM-97 and Iveco LMV MRAPs in wheeled mechanized infantry battalions, wheeled motorized infantry battalions and reconnaissance battalions
 Humvees, GAZ Tiger, Roshel Senators, Joint Light Tactical Vehicles, ATF Dingo,  BATT UMG, Snatch Land Rover, Gaia Amir, MSPV Panthera T6, Novator, VPK-Ural armored cars and mobility vehicles in wheeled motorized infantry battalions and reconnaissance battalions

References

forum.milua.org (for 62nd Bde details)

Army units and formations of Ukraine